James Thomas Garry  (September 21, 1869 – January 13, 1917) was a pitcher in Major League Baseball for the 1893 Boston Beaneaters.  He had an extensive career as a minor league baseball player, which stretched from 1891 through 1913. He played primarily in the Eastern League but also played in the Connecticut State League, New England League, Western League, American League, New York State League, Hudson River League and Eastern Association. He was a player/manager in 1899, 1904 and 1905.

External links

1869 births
1917 deaths
19th-century baseball players
Major League Baseball pitchers
Boston Beaneaters players
Manchester Gazettes players
Minneapolis Minnies players
Rochester Browns players
Springfield Maroons players
Syracuse Stars (minor league baseball) players
Buffalo Bisons (minor league) players
Milwaukee Brewers (minor league) players
Montreal Royals players
Hartford Indians players
Wooden Nutmegs players
Waterbury Rough Riders players
Newark Sailors players
Troy Trojans (minor league) players
Schenectady Frog Alleys players
Schenectady Electricians players
Scranton Miners players
Albany Senators players
Glens Falls-Saratoga Springs players
Wilkes-Barre Barons (baseball) players
Binghamton Bingoes players
Springfield Ponies players
Meriden Hopes players
Minor league baseball managers
Lehigh Mountain Hawks baseball coaches
People from Great Barrington, Massachusetts
Baseball players from Massachusetts
Baseball player-managers
Sportspeople from Berkshire County, Massachusetts